In Greek mythology, Ocalea or Ocaleia (Ancient Greek: Ὠκάλεια) was an Argive queen as the wife of King Abas. She was the daughter of Mantineus and by her husband, she became the mother of twin sons, Acrisius and Proetus. Often, she was referred to as Aglaïa.

Argive genealogy

Note

Women in Greek mythology

Reference 

 Apollodorus, The Library with an English Translation by Sir James George Frazer, F.B.A., F.R.S. in 2 Volumes, Cambridge, MA, Harvard University Press; London, William Heinemann Ltd. 1921. ISBN 0-674-99135-4. Online version at the Perseus Digital Library. Greek text available from the same website.

Characters in Greek mythology